Friends United Meeting (FUM) is an association of twenty-six yearly meetings of the Religious Society of Friends (Quakers) in North America, Africa, and the Caribbean. Its home pages states that it is "a collection of Christ-centered Quakers, embracing 34 yearly meetings and associations, thousands of local gatherings and hundreds of thousands of individuals."  In addition there are several individual monthly meetings and organizations that are members of FUM; FUM's headquarters is in Richmond, Indiana, and has offices in Kisumu, Kenya. Friends United Meeting is a member of the National Council of Churches in the United States of America.

There are five other branches within American Quakerism, two of them represented by parallel organizations (Friends General Conference and Evangelical Friends Church International), the third (Central Yearly Meeting of Friends), the fourth (Conservative Friends),  and the fifth (Beanite Quakerism), the fourth and the fifth having no single unifying organization.  Of these six branches, FUM has the largest number of individual members. In 2005, there were 42,680 members in 427 congregations in the United States. The Friends United Meeting is responsible for much of the growth of Quakerism in Africa and Latin America.

History
15 years after the signing on the Richmond Declaration in 1887, Five Years Meeting was established in 1902 by a collection of orthodox yearly meetings.

After World War I, growing desire for a more fundamentalist approach began to split Five Years Meeting. in 1926, Northwest Yearly Meeting withdrew from the organization, leading several other yearly meetings and scattered monthly meetings. In 1947, the Association of Evangelical Friends was formed, which led in turn to the 1965 formation of the Evangelical Friends Association, a precursor to today's Evangelical Friends International, formed in 1989.

During the 1950s many yearly meetings in North America reunited and became joint members of Five Years Meeting and Friends General Conference.

In 1963 Five Years Meeting was renamed Friends United Meeting.

Beliefs and worship 

There are two other similar organizations within Quakerism, Friends General Conference and Evangelical Friends Church International; each of these three organizations represent different branches within Quakerism, with the FGC occupying a more liberal universalist theological viewpoint and the EFCI representing an admixture of Quakerism and conservative evangelicalism.

As the largest organization of Quakers, Friends United Meeting is decidedly centrist and contains a wide range of Christian Quaker theological outlooks from very progressive and inclusive views to very conservative and traditional beliefs among individual members, Monthly Meetings or Churches, and affiliated Yearly Meetings within FUM. This has historically led to some friction within the larger organization. FUM also serves a wide range of Quaker worship styles in their Meetings for worship from unprogrammed, which is lay-led and on the basis of silence, to semi-programmed, which is pastor-led and include some elements of a traditional church service in addition to a period of open worship, to completely programmed.

Friends United Meeting considers itself to be noncreedal which allows it to embrace a wide range of Christian Quaker theological viewpoints.

Friends have no creeds—no official words can substitute for a personal relationship with God through Jesus Christ. These unofficial statements give a general sense of Friends’ faith.
 
God is love and wants to communicate inwardly with everyone who is willing.
Worship is spiritual and must be Spirit-led.
All people are equal before God and may minister as they are led by God.
Jesus Christ is our present Teacher and Lord, and we seek to conduct church affairs in unity under his guidance
The Spirit of God gives guidance that is consistent with the Bible.
As people respond to the Light of Christ within, their lives begin to reflect Jesus’ peace, integrity, simplicity and moral purity.

References

External links
Friends United Meeting (Official website)
Quaker Life: - Official publication of Friends United Meeting
Friends United Meeting Press:- Friends United Meeting Publishing House
Friends United Meeting:- Association of Religion Data Archives

Christian organizations established in 1902
Richmond, Indiana
Quaker organizations established in the 20th century
Members of the National Council of Churches
International bodies of Protestant denominations
Members of the World Council of Churches
1902 establishments in the United States